Andrei Pătrui (born 1 July 1996) is a Romanian tennis player.

External links

 
 

1996 births
Living people
Romanian male tennis players
Olympic tennis players of Romania
21st-century Romanian people